ASTM F568M is an ASTM International standard for metric bolts, screws and studs that are used in general engineering applications. It is titled: Standard Specification for Carbon and Alloy Steel Externally Threaded Metric Fasteners. It defines mechanical properties for fasteners that range from M1.6 to 100 in diameter. The standard was withdrawn in 2012. and has been replaced by ISO 898-1

This standard defines property classes, the metric equivalent of a screw grade, that are almost identical to those defined by ISO 898-1, except for the addition of the 8.8.3 and 10.9.3 classes. These two additional standards are fasteners that have the same mechanical properties as their base property class (i.e. 8.8 and 10.9), but are made from weathering steel. The standard is referenced by ASME B18.29.2M, which defines insert length selection for helical coil screw thread inserts.

This is a standard set by the standards organization ASTM International, a voluntary standards development organization that sets technical standards for materials, products, systems, and services.

Mechanical properties

See also 
 ASTM A325
 ISO metric screw thread
 Shear force
 Ultimate tensile strength

References

Bibliography
.

ASTM standards
Screws